Parascutigera sphinx is a species of centipede in the Scutigeridae family. It is endemic to Australia. It was first described in 1925 by German myriapodologist Karl Wilhelm Verhoeff.

Distribution
The species occurs in south-west Western Australia. The type locality is Perth).

Behaviour
The centipedes are solitary terrestrial predators that inhabit plant litter and soil.

References

 

 
sphinx
Centipedes of Australia
Endemic fauna of Australia
Fauna of Western Australia
Animals described in 1925
[[Category:Taxa named by Karl Wilhelm Verhoeff
]]